Fitzroy Island is an island  east of the southern tip of Stonington Island, lying in Neny Bay at the foot of Northeast Glacier, by which it is partially covered, off the west coast of Graham Land, Antarctica. The island was presumably first sighted in 1936 by the British Graham Land Expedition, and was roughly charted by them and by the U.S. Antarctic Service, 1939–41. It was surveyed in 1947 by the Falkland Islands Dependencies Survey (FIDS) who named it for the RMS Fitzroy, a FIDS ship which visited this area in 1947.

References

Islands of Graham Land
Fallières Coast